Kosmos 481 ( meaning Cosmos 481), known before launch as DS-P1-Yu No.46, was a Soviet satellite which was launched in 1972 as part of the Dnepropetrovsk Sputnik programme. It was a  spacecraft, which was built by the Yuzhnoye Design Bureau, and was used as a radar calibration target for anti-ballistic missile tests.

Launch 
Kosmos 481 was successfully launched into low Earth orbit at 10:39:59 UTC on 25 March 1972. The launch took place from Site 133/1 at the Plesetsk Cosmodrome, and used a Kosmos-2I 63SM carrier rocket.

Orbit 
Upon reaching orbit, it was assigned its Kosmos designation, and received the International Designator 1972-020A. The North American Aerospace Defense Command assigned it the catalogue number 05906.

Kosmos 481 was the fifty-first of seventy nine DS-P1-Yu satellites to be launched, and the forty-sixth of seventy two to successfully reach orbit. It remained in orbit until it decayed and reentered the atmosphere on 2 September 1972.

See also

 1972 in spaceflight

References

1972 in spaceflight
Kosmos satellites
Spacecraft launched in 1972
Spacecraft which reentered in 1972
Dnepropetrovsk Sputnik program